The Soaring Softly Stakes is a Grade III American Thoroughbred horse race for three years old fillies, over a distance of 7 furlongs on the turf held annually in May at Belmont Park in Elmont, New York.  The event currently carries a purse of $100,000.

History

In 2018 the event was classified as Grade III.

The race was renamed in 2016 to the Soaring Softly Stakes after the 1999 American Champion Female Turf Horse and inaugural Breeders' Cup Filly and Mare Turf  winner Soaring Softly.

Records
Speed record: 
1:19:93 - Morticia (2017)

Margins: 
 4 lengths - Nootka Sound (2018)

Most wins by a jockey:
 2 - Eric Cancel  (2016, 2021)

Most wins by a trainer:
 3 - Wesley A. Ward (2014, 2018, 2022)

Most wins by an owner:
 No owner has won this race more than once.

Winners

Legend:

References

Graded stakes races in the United States
Grade 3 stakes races in the United States
2014 establishments in New York (state)
Recurring sporting events established in 2014
Horse races in New York (state)
Flat horse races for three-year-old fillies